This is the discography of the Cantopop singer Sammi Cheng including a list of singles and cover songs.

Studio albums
English translations adapted from Tidal.

Cantonese-language albums

Mandarin-language studio albums

Mini Albums / EP

Compilation albums

Greatest Hits Albums

Remix albums

Video albums

Concert albums

Singles
This is a list of all her singles throughout her music career.

Cover Songs

This is a list of all Sammi Cheng's cover songs.

References

Cheng, Sammi
Pop music discographies